Yuraqqucha (Quechua yuraq white, qucha lake, "white lake", Hispanicized spelling Yuraccocha) is a  mountain in the Andes of Peru near a small lake of the same name. It is located in the Junín Region, Yauli Province, Morococha District, northeast of the peak of Challwaqucha.

References

Mountains of Peru
Mountains of Junín Region
Lakes of Peru
Lakes of Junín Region